Carmen Schäfer (born 8 January 1981 in Davos) is a Swiss curler. She plays third for Mirjam Ott.

Schäfer had a fairly successful Junior career. She was the alternate on the Swiss team (skipped by Silvana Tirinzoni) that won the 1999 World Junior Championships, but she did not play any games. Schäfer skipped the Swiss team at the 2000 and 2001 World Juniors, finishing fourth and winning the bronze medal respectively. In 2000, she lost to the U.S. team (skipped by Laura Delaney) in the bronze medal game, 8–5. She had to beat Moe Meguro's Japanese team to capture the bronze in 2001, winning the game 5–4.

In 2007, Schäfer joined Ott's team. They finished in fourth place at the 2007 European Curling Championships. They avenged their defeat at the 2008 Ford World Women's Curling Championship when they won the bronze medal; once again she had to beat Japan and their skip, Meguro. The Japanese had beaten them in the 3–4 game, but in the bronze medal rematch, had slipped.

At the 2010 Vancouver Olympic Games, her team, again skipped by Mirjam Ott, finished in fourth place, as Ott's touch completely deserted her late in the semi-final and bronze medal matches.

In 2008, Schäfer played in the Continental Cup of Curling.

References

External links
Team Davos
 

1981 births
Living people
People from Davos
Swiss female curlers
Curlers at the 2010 Winter Olympics
Curlers at the 2014 Winter Olympics
Olympic curlers of Switzerland
World curling champions
European curling champions
Sportspeople from Graubünden
21st-century Swiss women